Edward Mason may refer to:

Edward E. Mason (1912–1971), American surgeon
Edward J. Mason (1912–1971), British scriptwriter
Edward J. Mason (politician) (1930–2020), Maryland state senator
Edward Haven Mason (1849–1917), philatelist
Edward S. Mason (1899–1992), American economist

See also
Edward Masen, Twilight character